Santino "Sonny" Corleone is a fictional character in Mario Puzo's 1969 novel The Godfather and its 1972 film adaptation.

He is the eldest son of the mafia don Vito Corleone and Carmela Corleone. He has two brothers, Fredo and Michael, and a sister, Connie. In the film, Sonny was portrayed by James Caan, who briefly reprised his role for a flashback scene in The Godfather Part II.

Director Francis Ford Coppola's son Roman Coppola played Sonny as a boy in the 1920s scenes of The Godfather Part II.

Novel and film biography
In both the novel and the film, Sonny is the eldest of Vito Corleone's four children. Unlike his quiet, level-headed father, Sonny is fiery-tempered and prone to violence.

At age 16, Sonny commits a robbery. When Peter Clemenza, Vito's right-hand man and Sonny's godfather, informs Vito about it, Vito demands his son explain himself. Sonny replies that he had witnessed Vito murder the "Black Hand" gangster Don Fanucci years before, and he now wants to join the "family business". Vito sends him to Clemenza for training.

Sonny "makes his bones" at age 19. By his mid-20s, he is promoted to a caporegime in the Corleone family. By the end of World War II, he is his father's underboss and heir apparent, popular and feared as a merciless killer with a short temper. Sonny is not without a sensitive side, however; at age 11, he brings home a homeless boy, Tom Hagen, demanding he be allowed to live with the family. Vito informally adopts Hagen, who eventually rises through the ranks to become Vito's consigliere. As the eldest child, Sonny acts as protector to his younger siblings and has a soft-spot for his youngest brother, Michael. Although he can beat up and kill other men without hesitation, he cannot bring himself to harm women, children, or anyone unable to defend themselves.

Sonny has four children with his wife Sandra. He also has several mistresses, including his sister Connie's friend Lucy Mancini. In the novel, Sandra allows – and is grateful for – his infidelities because she is unable to take the size of his penis.

Sonny's life is upturned in 1945, when drug lord Virgil "The Turk" Sollozzo, backed by the Tattaglia family, approaches Vito with an offer to enter the narcotics trade. During the meeting, Sonny speaks out of turn, expressing an interest in the deal that Vito declines. Vito later castigates Sonny for revealing his thoughts to an outsider. Sollozzo later attempts to have Vito assassinated, believing Sonny, as his father's successor, will bring the Corleone family into the drug trade.

The failed assassination attempt leaves Vito near death, making Sonny acting boss of the Corleone family. Sonny orders Clemenza to execute Vito's traitorous bodyguard Paulie Gatto. Sollozzo mounts a second assassination attempt on Vito at the hospital, which Michael prevents. Sonny then orders Bruno Tattaglia, son and underboss of Sollozzo's ally Philip Tattaglia, to be murdered. Sollozzo proposes that Michael be sent to promote a truce. Sonny, believing it is a trick, refuses and demands that the other Mafia families hand over Sollozzo to the Corleone family or face war. Hagen successfully convinces Sonny to wait, because Captain Mark McCluskey, a corrupt NYPD captain on Sollozzo's payroll, has agreed to be Sollozzo's bodyguard. Hagen warns Sonny that killing McCluskey would violate a longstanding Mafia rule not to kill members of law enforcement, and that the backlash from rival Mafia families and law enforcement would be severe.

Michael, who had before wanted nothing to do with the family business, volunteers to kill Sollozzo and McCluskey, arguing that McCluskey is fair game because he is a corrupt cop mixed up in the drug trade. Sonny is impressed with Michael's confidence and seriousness, but doubts that his "nice college boy" brother is capable of murder. Ultimately, however, he approves the hit. Michael meets with Sollozzo and McCluskey at an Italian restaurant in the Bronx and kills both men. This ignites the New York underworld's first Mafia war in a decade. Sonny arranges for Michael to flee to Sicily under the protection of Vito's friend Don Tommasino.

The war between the Five Families drags on, and Sonny, unable to break the stalemate, orders bloody raids that earn him a legendary reputation. He also begins plotting to take out the rival Mafia bosses. Emilio Barzini, Vito's rival and the power behind Sollozzo, enlists Connie's abusive husband, Carlo Rizzi, to help set a trap. Earlier, Sonny assaulted Carlo after he attacked Connie. To draw Sonny out into the open, Carlo provokes Connie into an argument before severely beating her. Hysterical and in pain, she telephones the Corleone compound, asking Sonny for help. Enraged, Sonny speeds towards Connie's apartment in Hell's Kitchen ahead of his bodyguards. At the Long Beach Causeway toll plaza, Barzini's men trap Sonny and shoot him.

During a meeting with the other crime family dons to establish peace, Vito realizes that Barzini masterminded Sonny's murder. After Michael returns from Sicily, he assumes Sonny's place as Vito's heir apparent. Vito and Michael secretly continue Sonny's plot to wipe out the other New York dons to avenge Sonny's death and eliminate their rivals once and for all. After Vito dies in 1955 from a heart attack, Michael has the other dons murdered, including Barzini, who is shot twice in the back on the steps of a courthouse in broad daylight. Michael informs Carlo that the rival dons have been killed and coerces Carlo's confession for his part in arranging Sonny's murder. Carlo admits Barzini was the mastermind. On Michael's orders, Clemenza garrotes Carlo to death. With that strike, the Corleones become the most powerful crime family in the country.

Role in Godfather sequels 
As well as appearing in the original film, The Godfather, Sonny is featured in the sequel, The Godfather Part II. In this film, he briefly appears in some scenes as an infant and as a young child. He makes a final appearance at the end of the film, in a flashback scene that portrays Vito's birthday celebration in 1941. Michael announces that he has dropped out of college and enlisted to fight in World War II. Sonny is furious at the decision and berates his brother for risking his life "for a bunch of strangers". This scene also reveals that Sonny introduced Carlo to Connie, and the rest of the family, which led to their marriage.

In The Godfather Part III, Vincent Corleone is introduced as Sonny's illegitimate son with Lucy Mancini. Vincent succeeds Michael as head of the Corleone family at the end of the film. Vincent's existence in the film contradicts Puzo's original novel, which stated that Lucy never bore a child with Sonny.

Family 
 Vito Corleone: father; played by Marlon Brando and by Robert De Niro as young adult Vito Corleone
 Carmela Corleone: mother; played by Morgana King
 Sandra Corleone: wife; played by Julie Gregg
 Tom Hagen: adoptive brother; played by Robert Duvall
 Fredo Corleone: brother; played by John Cazale
 Michael Corleone: brother; played by Al Pacino
 Constanzia "Connie" Corleone: sister; played by Talia Shire
 Mary Corleone: niece; played by Sofia Coppola
 Anthony Corleone: nephew; played by Anthony Gounaris (The Godfather); played by James Gounaris (The Godfather Part II); played by Franc D'Ambrosio in The Godfather Part III
 Francesca Corleone: daughter, born 1937
 Kathryn Corleone: daughter, born 1937
 Frank Corleone: son, born 1940
 Santino Corleone Jr.: son, born 1945
 Vincent Corleone: son with Lucy Mancini born 1948, played by Andy García

Behind the scenes 

 Coppola staged Sonny's death scene in The Godfather to be reminiscent of the final death scene of Clyde Barrow (Warren Beatty) and Bonnie Parker (Faye Dunaway) in Bonnie and Clyde.
 Coppola had the car radio play the broadcast of the baseball playoff game won by Bobby Thomson hitting the Shot Heard Round the World. This would place Sonny's death on October 3, 1951, contradicting the novel by several years.
 Among the actors auditioning for the role of Michael during casting for The Godfather, one unknown off-Broadway actor named Robert De Niro also read for Sonny's part, as well as Michael's and Carlo's, without success. Raw footage of him in the scene where Paulie Gatto offers to kill Rizzi can be seen on the DVD. Eventually, Coppola cast Caan in the role and gave De Niro the part of Paulie, but he "traded" him to the film The Gang That Couldn't Shoot Straight for Al Pacino, who soon got the part of Michael. Anthony Perkins not only auditioned for Sonny, but also for Tom Hagen.
 Originally Caan was to be cast as the main character Michael Corleone (Sonny's youngest brother), while Carmine Caridi was signed as Sonny. However Coppola demanded that the role of Michael be played by Al Pacino instead. The studio agreed to Pacino but insisted on having Caan be cast as Sonny, so he remained in the production.
 Caan was nominated for an Academy Award for Best Supporting Actor for his performance in the film, competing with co-stars Pacino and Robert Duvall, giving the movie three entries in that category.

Cultural references 
 Sonny's death scene has been parodied several times on The Simpsons, including in the final scene of "All's Fair in Oven War", an episode in which Caan lent his voice. In that episode, the tollbooth death scene is re-enacted as part of Cletus Spuckler's revenge on Caan for "stealing" his wife Brandine's heart. Sonny's death was parodied in the earlier episode "Mr. Plow", in a scene where Bart is pelted with snowballs by his schoolmates when his father Homer clears the snow in front of the school. The scene where Sonny beats Carlo Rizzi has also been parodied, in the episode "Strong Arms of the Ma".
 The tollbooth scene was parodied along with the execution montage in the final scene of the Harvey Birdman, Attorney at Law episode "Dabba Don". In this scene the Ant Hill Mob from Wacky Races gun down Judge Mightor from their car.
 Popular sportswriter Bill Simmons used to frequently compare the "Sonny Corleone move" to the "Michael Corleone move" when referring to hasty, rash decisions that end badly when a patient, reasoned approach would have been far more successful.  Often, this analogy was applied to free agent signings and trades in the NBA.
 Conan O'Brien also used the tollbooth scene in a parody on Conan, explaining how he was dropped from NBC.
 In the HBO series The Sopranos, the fictional strip club Bada Bing is named after the catchphrase "bada bing" that Sonny uses to describe an up-close shooting.
 In an episode of Spin City when the Mayor is attacked in a campaign ad and the others discuss what to do, Deputy Mayor Charlie Crawford immediately suggests swift, ruthless, and immediate retaliation to which his coworker Caitlin (sarcastically) replies "Thank you Sonny Corleone."
 The main antagonist of the story in Grand Theft Auto: Vice City, Sonny Forelli, is possibly based on Sonny Corleone. Both of them act as a boss for their family, and both have the same ruthless, short-tempered personality.

References

External links 
 Plot Summary - The Godfather

The Godfather characters
Characters in American novels of the 20th century
Fictional characters from New York City
Literary characters introduced in 1969
Fictional capos
Fictional crime bosses
Fictional Italian American people
Fictional murderers
Fictional underbosses
Male characters in literature
Male characters in film
Cultural depictions of the Mafia
Fictional murdered people
Film characters introduced in 1972